Ganjeolgot is a park and popular tourist destination in Seosaeng-myeon, Ulju County, Ulsan, South Korea. Every New Year's Eve, people gather at the park for the Ganjeolgot Sunrise Festival. Ganjeolgot is the easternmost part of the Korean Peninsula, so it is where you can see the first sunrise of the year, earlier than anywhere else in Korea. Ganjeolgot is also home to the world's second-largest mailbox, which was built in 2006. People write their wishes on postcards and put them in the mailbox with the belief that doing this will make their wishes come true. The name Ganjeolgot is composed of two parts: Ganjeol, Chinese for a long bamboo pole used to harvest fruits from tall trees, and Got, a native Korean word meaning "cape." The name refers to the geographical shape of the area.

See also 
 List of South Korean tourist attractions
 South Korea portal

References

External links 
 Tourist information for Ganjeolgot
 Tourist information for Ganjeolgot Sunrise Festival 

Parks in Ulsan
Tourist attractions in Ulsan
Headlands of South Korea